Metropolitan Porto Alegre is one of the seven Mesoregions of the state of Rio Grande do Sul in Brazil. It consists of 98 municipalities, grouped in 6 Microregions:
 Camaquã
 Gramado-Canela
 Montenegro
 Osório
 Porto Alegre
 São Jerônimo

References

Mesoregions of Rio Grande do Sul